Waring is an English surname with two derivation hypotheses: from the Frankish Warin, meaning 'guard,' via Norman French Guarin, or from the Anglo-Saxon Wæring, meaning 'confederate' or, more literally, 'oath companion.' Both hypotheses suggest that Wareing is a variant of this name. (Ware, as in the modern English aware and beware, is derived from the Anglo-Saxon waer.) Notable people with the surname include:

Antonio J. Waring, Jr. (1915–1964), American amateur archaeologist
Amanda Waring, British  actress, singer and campaigner, daughter of Derek
Charles Waring (1827–1887), British  politician and Liberal MP
Charles E. Waring (1909–1981), American chemist and educator
Derek Waring (1927–2007), British  actor, father of Amanda
Dorothy Grace Waring (1891–1977), English fascist campaigner and novelist
Edward Waring (c. 1736–1798), British  mathematician and eponym of Waring's Problem
Eddie Waring (1910–1986), British  sports commentator
Edmund Waring (c. 1638–1687), British  member of Parliament
Elijah Waring (c. 1788–1857), Quaker and Anglo-Welsh writer
Everett J. Waring (1859–ca. 1914), first African-American admitted to the Maryland State Bar Association and to try a case before the American Supreme Court
Fred Waring (1900–1984), American bandleader who popularized the Waring blender
George E. Waring, Jr. (1833–1898), American civic reformer
Jack Waring (footballer) (1909–1991), English footballer
Jane Rose Waring (c. 1819–1914), maiden name of Jane Roberts, First Lady of Liberia
James N. H. Waring (1861–1923), African-American educator, physician, and activist
Jim Waring (born 1967), American politician
Laura Wheeler Waring (1887-1948), American artist
Marilyn Waring (born 1952), New Zealand feminist
Myfanwy Waring (born 1977), Welsh actress
Richard Waring (1910–1983), British  actor
Richard Waring (writer) (1925–1994), British  comedy writer
Robert O. Waring (1919–1976), American diplomat assassinated by terrorists in Beirut in 1976
Stephanie Waring (born 1978), English actress
Tom Waring (1906–1980), British  footballer
William Herbert Waring (1885–1918), Welsh recipient of the Victoria Cross for his actions in World War I
Will Waring, Canadian camera operator and television director
Wayne Waring, Warder at Walton with a large head

See also
 Waering, a surname
 Wareing, a surname
 Wearing (surname)

References